The Pustovoitenko Government was created after the Ukrainian parliament had ousted the previous Cabinet of Pavlo Lazarenko on April 26, 2001.

On July 16, 1997, 226 deputies voted for the appointment of Valeriy Pustovoitenko, chairman of the People's Democratic Party, as Prime Minister of Ukraine. His new government was Ukraine's eighth since Ukraine gained its independence in August 1991.

On November 30, 1999 the Cabinet resign due to reelection of President Kuchma in 1999.

Composition

References

External links

Ukrainian governments
1997 establishments in Ukraine
1999 disestablishments in Ukraine
Cabinets established in 1997
Cabinets disestablished in 1999